Conjure Wife (1943) is a supernatural horror novel by American writer Fritz Leiber. Its premise is that witchcraft flourishes as an open secret among women. The story is told from the point of view of a small-town college professor who discovers that his wife is a witch.

This novel was the first by Fritz Leiber and was first published in the April 1943 edition of Unknown. It is said to have been the inspiration for at least three films: Weird Woman (1944),
Night of the Eagle (also known as Burn, Witch, Burn!) (1962), and  
Witches' Brew (also known as Which Witch is Which?) (1980).

In 2019, the novel was awarded the "Retro" Hugo Award for Best Novel.

Plot
Tansy Saylor is the wife of an up-and-coming young sociology professor at a small, conservative American college. She is also a witch.  Her husband, Norman, discovers this one day while rummaging through her dressing table: he finds vials of graveyard dirt, packets of hair and fingernail clippings from their acquaintances, and other evidence of her witchcraft. He confronts Tansy, and manages to convince her that her faith in magic is a result of superstition and neurosis.  Tansy burns her charms; and Norman's luck immediately goes sour. He realizes that he had been protected, up till now, by Tansy's charms, and that as a result of his meddling, they are both now powerless to counteract the spells and charms of the other witches all around them.

Critical response
The novel is widely acknowledged to be a classic of modern horror fiction. It was included in David Pringle's Modern Fantasy: The 100 Best Novels and in Fantasy: The 100 Best Books by James Cawthorn and Michael Moorcock. In The Encyclopedia of Fantasy, David Langford described it as "an effective exercise in the paranoid."

Damon Knight wrote

Anthony Boucher and McComas similarly lauded the novel as "one of the best of all novels on witchcraft survivals in the enlightened modern world." P. Schuyler Miller described it as "one of those classics we talk about so glibly," despite finding the denouement less effective than the setup. The New York Times reviewer Basil Davenport noted it was marked by "real excitement".

Everett F. Bleiler found Conjure Wife to be "nicely handled as a suspense story, although Saylor's psychology is a little simplistic."

Publication
Conjure Wife was originally published in the April 1943 volume of Unknown Worlds. An "expanded and revised" version was published by Twayne Publishers in its Witches Three anthology in 1952, then issued as a stand-alone novel in 1953. The latter version has been reprinted many times, in both hardcover and paperback editions, by a variety of publishers, including Ace Books, Tom Doherty Associates, Penguin Books, and Award Publications.

References

External links

 Conjure Wife on Google Books
 Conjure Wife on Project Gutenberg

1943 American novels
1943 debut novels
1943 fantasy novels
American fantasy novels adapted into films
American horror novels
Debut fantasy novels
Debut horror novels
Novels by Fritz Leiber